Greet Minnen (born 14 August 1997) is a Belgian tennis player.

She has career-high WTA rankings of No. 69 in singles, achieved on 18 October 2021, and world No. 47 in doubles, attained on 15 August 2022.

Career
Minnen made her WTA Tour main-draw debut at the 2018 Luxembourg Open in the doubles draw, partnering Alison Van Uytvanck. They won the title, defeating Vera Lapko and Mandy Minella in the final, in two sets.

In May 2021, again partnering Van Uytvanck in a second WTA tournament doubles final, she lost to Aleksandra Krunić and Nina Stojanović in Belgrade. In September, she won the Luxembourg Open, her second WTA Tour doubles title, also partnering Van Uytvanck.

In the first round of Wimbledon 2022, she beat former world No. 1 and former Wimbledon champion, Garbiñe Muguruza 6–4, 6–0, and scored the first top-10 win of her career.

Personal life
Minnen was in a relationship with fellow Belgian tennis player Alison Van Uytvanck.

Born in Turnhout, she reached in her last year as a junior the girls' doubles final of the 2015 Australian Open, losing in two sets.

Performance timelines

Only main-draw results in WTA Tour, Grand Slam tournaments, Fed Cup/Billie Jean King Cup and Olympic Games are included in win–loss records.

Singles
Current after the 2023 Australian Open.

Doubles
Current after the 2022 Championnats de Granby.

WTA career finals

Doubles: 3 (2 titles, 1 runner-up)

WTA 125 tournament finals

Doubles: 1 (title)

ITF Circuit finals

Singles: 21 (11 titles, 10 runner–ups)

Doubles: 3 (2 titles, 1 runner–up)

Junior Grand Slam finals

Doubles: 1 (runner-up)

Head-to-head record

Top 10 wins

Notes

References

External links
 
 

1997 births
Living people
Belgian female tennis players
Sportspeople from Turnhout
Tennis players at the 2014 Summer Youth Olympics
Lesbian sportswomen
Belgium LGBT sportspeople
LGBT tennis players
21st-century Belgian women